Robert Russell Porter (1908-1986) was an American radio, television and theater actor and director.

Biography
Robert Russell Porter was born in Sterling, Kansas on November 20, 1908. His mother, Catherine (Cassie) Wiggins Porter, was a country schoolteacher and his father, Ellis Kenneth Porter, was a photographer and part-time farmer. They raised five sons. The eldest, Kenneth Wiggins Porter (1905–1981) was a well-known historian and poet. Russell Porter earned a B.S. in education from Emporia State Teachers College and an M.S. in speech from Northwestern University. From 1931 until his retirement, Porter was a teacher and practitioner of radio, television and theater arts. He wrote, performed, produced and directed countless plays, operas and narrative poems. Porter received many honors from the University of Denver, the community and international theater organizations. Some of the most prestigious were his election as the seventh University of Denver Lecturer, an honorary Doctorate of Humane Letters from the University of Denver, and the Colorado Governor's Award for Distinguished Service in Arts and Humanities. He married Miriam (Mimi) Gilson Porter in 1932 and together they raised one daughter, Phyllida Teresa Porter, who was born in 1934. Miriam was also active in the radio and theater world as an actress. Robert Russell Porter died on August 4, 1986. Miriam Porter continued living in Denver, until her death in 1995.

References

Northwestern University School of Communication alumni
People from Sterling, Kansas
1908 births
1986 deaths